Brandon Lee (born 5 November 1964) is an Australian former professional rugby league footballer who primarily played as a .  The teams he played for at a club level were Penrith and Canterbury-Bankstown.

Playing career
Lee made his first grade debut for Penrith in round 26 of the 1984 season against Parramatta at Penrith Park.  

The following year, Penrith reached their first finals campaign since entering the competition in 1967.  Lee played in their 38–6 loss against Parramatta in the minor preliminary semi final.  

Lee played with Penrith until the end of the 1987 season before signing with Canterbury.  In his first year at Canterbury, Lee played in the 1988 grand final victory over Balmain at the Sydney Football Stadium.  

Lee returned to Penrith in 1991 but only played 4 games for the first grade team.  Lee did not play in Penrith's maiden premiership victory over the Canberra Raiders.

References

1964 births
Living people
Australian rugby league players
Canterbury-Bankstown Bulldogs players
Penrith Panthers players
Rugby league props
Rugby league hookers
Rugby league second-rows
Rugby league players from Penrith, New South Wales